Ippolita is a feminine given name related to Hippolyte. It may refer to:

 Ippolita d'Este (1620–1656), Italian noblewoman
 Ippolita Gonzaga (1503–1570), Italian noblewoman and nun
 Ippolita Ludovisi (1663–1733), Italian Princess of Piombino
 Ippolita Rostagno (born 1963), Italian-American jewelry maker
 Ippolita Maria Sforza (1445/6–1488), Italian noblewoman
 Ippolita Maria Sforza (1493–1501), Italian noblewoman
 Ippolita Trivulzio (1600–1638), Italian Princess of Monaco by marriage

Italian feminine given names